"Weapons" is a song by American singer Ava Max, from her second studio album Diamonds & Dancefloors (2023). It was released on November 10, 2022 by Atlantic Records as the third single off the album.  The track was revealed after being leaked on September 1, 2022, with various other Diamonds & Dancefloors tracks. The official instrumental also leaked on September 18, 2022. The official visualizer premiered exclusively through her Facebook account on February 28, 2023.

Background
On July 24, 2022, Ava Max posted pictures on Twitter. One of the images was a sword necklace, possibly hinting at her song "Weapons". Another image was a bunch of money, teasing "Million Dollar Baby".

On October 28, 2022, Max first teased the single via a TikTok post stating, “Listening to my next song I’m putting out…,” to which she captioned with “W or S?” and a winking face. The next day, Max posted an official snippet through TikTok again, but this time containing audio of the song and announcing the release date. Prior to release, Max also stated in an interview that her next single would be very inspiring with a powerful message and is “Probably one of [her] favorite songs on Diamonds & Dancefloors.”

Charts

Release history

References

2022 singles
2022 songs
Ava Max songs
Song recordings produced by Cirkut (record producer)
Songs written by Ava Max
Songs written by Cirkut (record producer)
Songs written by Madison Love
Songs written by Ryan Tedder